Simon Hinton (born 21 March 1968) is a New Zealand former cricketer. He played one first-class match for Otago in 1994/95.

See also
 List of Otago representative cricketers

References

External links
 

1968 births
Living people
New Zealand cricketers
Otago cricketers
People from Clyde, New Zealand